Rezi is a village in Zala County, Hungary. Nearby are the ruins of a 13th-14th century hilltop castle, which looks down off a 418-meter hill.

External links 
 Street map

References

Populated places in Zala County